is a Japanese ski jumper.

In the World Cup his highest place was number 17 from February 2005 in Sapporo.

External links

eSkiJumping.com

1976 births
Living people
Japanese male ski jumpers
Universiade medalists in ski jumping
Sportspeople from Sapporo
Universiade bronze medalists for Austria
Competitors at the 1997 Winter Universiade
Competitors at the 1999 Winter Universiade
20th-century Japanese people